was a Japanese composer of classical music with a modern approach. Nagasawa  composed for traditional Japanese musical instruments (e.g., Shakuhachi, Koto, Shamisen).

Nagasawa was born in 1923 in Tokyo and graduated from Nihon University. He was one of the founding members of Pro Musica Nipponia (日本音楽集団) in 1964, a group of famous Japanese composers and musicians who aim at performing classical and contemporary compositions from both Japan and the West.  The group's music is performed by traditional Japanese musical instruments. From 1949, he was also the musical supervisor for the puppet theater “Puk.” In 1990, he received the Purple Ribbon Medal from the Japanese government. He has been part of six overseas tours with Pro Musica Nipponia.

Major works
Two Dances for Japanese traditional music ensemble 
One Day in Spring for Japanese traditional music ensemble
Shikyokyu for shakuhachi solo
Hoshun for shakuhachi and koto
Mayudama-no-uta for shakuhachi and koto
Quartet for koto and jushichigen
Two Pastorals for shakuhachi, koto and jushichigen

References

External links
 The International Shakuhachi Society - Biography: Nagasawa Katsutoshi - 長沢 勝俊
 Pro Musica Nipponia (日本音楽集団)
 Obituary 

1923 births
2008 deaths
20th-century classical composers
20th-century Japanese composers
20th-century Japanese male musicians
Japanese classical composers
Japanese male classical composers
Nihon University alumni